Without Evidence is a 1996 thriller film directed and co-written by Gill Dennis in his first and last film he directed. It stars Scott Plank, Anna Gunn, Angelina Jolie, Paul Perri, and Andrew Prine. It was co-written by Dennis and Phil Stanford.

Plot 

Without Evidence is based on the true story of Michael Francke, who was the Head of Corrections for the state of Oregon before being murdered. Just before his murder, Francke visits his brother and informs him of a drug ring involving his prison colleagues. When Michael is killed, his brother begins his own investigation into the murder, leading him to more lies and deceit.

Cast
Scott Plank – Kevin Francke
Anna Gunn – Liz Godlove
Andrew Prine – John Nelson
Angelina Jolie – Jodie Swearingen
Paul Perri – Sgt. Unsoeld
Ernie Garrett - Michael Francke
Edwin Collier - Paul Fisk

References

External links
 
 

1995 films
1990s psychological thriller films
American psychological thriller films
American courtroom films
American docudrama films
1990s English-language films
1990s American films